Single-stranded DNA-binding protein 3 is a protein that in humans is encoded by the SSBP3 gene.

References

Further reading